Diogo Vaz is a settlement in the Lembá District on the western coast of São Tomé Island in São Tomé and Príncipe. Its population is 632 (2012 census). It lies 7 km southwest of Neves and 6 km northeast of Santa Catarina. It was established as a plantation complex, Roça de Diogo Vaz.

Population history

References

Populated places in Lembá District
Populated coastal places in São Tomé and Príncipe